Miaoli Tunnel, commonly known as Gongweixu Tunnel, is a former railway tunnel in Miaoli City, Miaoli County, Taiwan. In 2003, the tunnel was converted into a pedestrian walkway as part of Maolishan Park and is a popular tourist attraction.

Etymology 
The official name of the tunnel used by the Taiwan Railway Administration is Miaoli Tunnel. However, the tunnel is more commonly known as "Gongweixu Tunnel" or simply "Gongweixu". When the tunnel was completed in 1903, then Governor General of Taiwan Kodama Gentarō visited the site and wrote the characters "Gongweixu" on the plaque above the north entrance, hence the alternative name. The source of "Gongweixu" is thought to be the "Counsels of Great Yu" chapter of the Book of Documents.

History 
Miaoli Tunnel was constructed between 1902 and 1903 by Taiwan Governor-General Railways during Japan's rule over the island. The 460 m long tunnel was single-tracked and constructed with brick walls. The 1935 Shinchiku-Taichū earthquake dealt significant damage to the earthquake and the tunnel was closed until 1938. In 1993, heavy rain destroyed a corner of the tunnel's north entrance.

The tunnel remained in use until 1998, when a new, double-tracked tunnel named Miaonan Tunnel (苗南隧道) was dug directly to the south. In 2003, the Miaoli City government redeveloped the tunnel into a tourist attraction by turning it into a pedestrian path and illuminating the walls with colorful LED lights. From October 2019 to January 2020, the tunnel was renovated to become wheelchair accessible.

Layout 
The north entrance of Gongweixu Tunnel is located in Maolishan Park. At the south entrance, there is a visitor center built out of shipping containers, which has a retired R20 series diesel-electric locomotive (numbered R46) and a passenger car on display. The visitor center also features a bridge built as a replica of the original north entrance.

References

External links 
 
 

Miaoli City
Railway tunnels in Taiwan
Tourist attractions in Miaoli County
1903 establishments in Taiwan
Train-related introductions in 1903
1998 disestablishments in Taiwan
2003 establishments in Taiwan